The 2009–10 Norwegian Futsal Premier League season (known as Telekiosken Futsal Liga for sponsorship reasons) is the second season for futsal in Norway. It began 21 November 2009 and ended 7 March 2010.

League table

Source: speaker.no
Rules for classification: 1st points; 2nd goal difference; 3rd goals scored.
P = Position; Pld = Matches played; W = Matches won; D = Matches drawn; L = Matches lost; GF = Goals for; GA = Goals against; GD = Goal difference; Pts = Points; (C) = Champion; (R) = Relegated.

References

See also
2009 in Norwegian football
2010 in Norwegian football
2009–10 Norwegian Futsal First Division

Norwegian
Futsal Premier League 2009-10
Futsal Premier League 2009-10
Futsal competitions in Norway